Stanislav Galimovich Hazheev (born 28 December 1941 in Kashtak, Chelyabinsk Oblast, Russian SFSR) is the former Minister of Defence in Transnistria. 

Hazheev was born in Kashtak, now a neighbourhood in the north of Chelyabinsk, in Russia. He is of Belarusian ethnicity. Hazheev is a career soldier, and studied first at the Suvorov Military School in Sverdlovsk, then at the Tashkent Higher All-Arms Command School, where he graduated in 1963, and finally at the Frunze Military Academy in Moscow.

He held various command positions in the Soviet Army, first in the Turkestan Military District, then in the Odessa Military District and after that in the Transbaikal Military District. From 1983 until 1986, Hazheev served as chief adviser to the Soviet military mission in the Socialist Republic of Vietnam. Back in the Soviet Union, he was assigned to the post of Deputy Commander of the Higher Military School of Vladikavkaz.

Hazheev and has worked in the armed forces of Transnistria since 1992, in that same year, he also became Minister of Defence. His first rank in the Transnistrian Army was lieutenant general, but he currently holds the rank of colonel general.

He has an adult son.

External links
 Official government biography

1941 births
Living people
Politicians from Chelyabinsk
Transnistrian people of Belarusian descent
Russian people of Belarusian descent
Transnistrian politicians
Frunze Military Academy alumni
Transnistrian military personnel
Tashkent Higher All-Arms Command School alumni